Vice Admiral Frederick Henry Stirling (1829 – November 1885) was a Royal Navy officer who went on to be Commander-in-Chief, Pacific Station. He was a son of Admiral Sir James Stirling, the first Governor of Western Australia and Ellen Mangles.

Naval career
Having been born at sea on the barque Parmelia, off the Cape of Good Hope, Stirling was appointed a Lieutenant in the Royal Navy in 1848. He went on to serve in the Black Sea during the Crimean War. Promoted to Captain in 1860, he was given command of HMS Warrior and then HMS Clio. He was appointed Commander-in-Chief, Australia Squadron, in 1870 and Commander-in-Chief, Pacific Station, in 1879.

See also

References

1828 births
1885 deaths
Royal Navy admirals
People born at sea